Second to Last Love, or , is a Japanese television drama series, starring Kyōko Koizumi and Kiichi Nakai. The series aired Thursdays at 22:00 - 22:54, on Fuji Television from January 12, to March 22, 2012.

A second season entitled  was broadcast by Fuji TV from April 17 to June 26, 2014.

Plot
Described as an adult love story, Saigo Kara Nibanme no Koi narrates the tale of Chiaki Yoshino (Kyōko Koizumi), a 45-year-old TV drama producer. As she is becoming older, Chiaki becomes increasingly more concerned about her health and retirement, instead of building romantic relationship with someone: The hope she once had of sharing her life with someone seems distant. Chiaki is subsequently troubled about deciding on taking a break from her ruling life, and such questions lead her to Kamakura, where she decides to settle. In this ancient city she meets Wahei Nagakura (Kiichi Nakai), a 50-year-old widower and father of one child who works for the city office.

Chiaki and Wahei start getting closer as they learn more about each other's lives. However, Wahei's family start obstructing the development of their relationship. Wahei's brother, Shinpei, starts courting Chiaki, creating a conflicting triangle relationship. On the other hand, Wahei's sister, Noriko, constantly harasses Chiaki. Facing these problematic family members, Chiaki and Wahei try to build and sustain their budding romance.

Cast
 Kyōko Koizumi as Chiaki Yoshino
 Kiichi Nakai as Wahei Nagakura
 Kenji Sakaguchi as Shinpei Nagakura
 Mariko Watanabe as Erina Nagakura
 Hiroko Moriguchi as Keiko Araki
 Kazuyuki Asano as Hiroyuki Mizutani
 Naoko Iijima as Noriko Mizutani
 Yuki Uchida as Midori Hatanaka

Episodes

Season 1

Special

Season 2

Awards
 Tokyo Drama Awards 2013 - Excellence Award (Saigo Kara Nibanme no Koi 2012 Aki)
 Tokyo Drama Awards 2014 - Best Screenplay (Yoshikazu Okada)

References

Fuji TV dramas
2012 Japanese television series debuts
Japanese drama television series
Japanese romance television series
Television shows written by Yoshikazu Okada
Television shows set in Kamakura
Saigo Kara Nibanme no Koi